Iakovos Trivolis (died 1547) was a Greek Renaissance humanist and writer. He published a historical work titled History of Tallapieras after the exploits of the namesake Venetian ship captain, and the Story of the King of Scotia and the Queen of England, inspired by part of the Decameron.

Both were written in modern Greek, and are sometimes credited as among the first to be published in that language since most Greek scholars wrote in the Koine.

See also
Greek scholars in the Renaissance

References

External links 
History of Tallapieras in greek wikisource 
Story of the King of Scotia and the Queen of England in greek wikisource 

16th-century Greek people
Greek Renaissance humanists
Modern Greek language
Writers from Corfu
1547 deaths
16th-century Greek writers
16th-century male writers